Dakota Central Telecommunications (formerly known as Daktel) is a utility cooperative based in Carrington, North Dakota. It provides landline telephone, dial-up, and broadband Internet services, along with IPTV service to several communities in Foster, Stutsman, and southern Wells counties, with Jamestown its largest community served.

Dakota Central was awarded a Community Connect Broadband Grant from the U.S. Department of Agriculture for bringing high speed internet access to rural areas surrounding Jamestown.

References

External links
 

Telecommunications companies of the United States
Carrington, North Dakota